Giovanni Barberis (born 25 April 1915 in Stroppiana) was an Italian football player.

External links

1915 births
Year of death missing
Italian footballers
Serie A players
F.C. Pro Vercelli 1892 players
Juventus F.C. players
Aurora Pro Patria 1919 players
Association football midfielders